"Inca Roads" is the opening track of the Frank Zappa and the Mothers of Invention 1975 album, One Size Fits All. The song features unusual time signatures, lyrics and vocals. The marimba-playing of Zappa's percussionist Ruth Underwood is featured prominently. The song was played in concert from 1970 to 1976, 1979 and 1988.

Themes
"Inca Roads" for the most part explores the stereotypes of aliens encountering the Incan civilization. These themes, like the album cover of One Size Fits All seem to parody the spirituality of many progressive rock albums around the same era. The lyrics "Did a vehicle come from somewhere out there, just to land in the Andes? Was it round and did it have a motor or was it something different?" imply that a UFO is landing in the Andes Mountains. As the song progresses, the lyrics become sillier and seem to mock the beginning of the song. An example of this is "...or did someone build a place or leave a space for Chester's thing to land (Chester's thing... on Ruth). Did a booger-bear come from somewhere out there..." The non-serious nature of these lyrics and even the music itself seem to be mocking other progressive rock bands and their possibly forced divine depth.

Song structure

"Inca Roads" uses mixed meter.

The song starts with dominant vocals, drums, and marimba, but soon features a guitar solo performed by Zappa in late September 1974 at a live performance in Helsinki, Finland. An edited version of this solo recording (and part of the bass and drums accompaniment) was "grafted" onto a performance of the song from August 27, 1974 at KCET in Los Angeles. This combination of performances forms the backbone of the album version from One Size Fits All. In the video of the KCET performance, entitled A Token of His Extreme, Zappa is seen smiling gleefully as Duke plays his solo, as he plays the backup chords. After a short marimba solo, "Inca Roads" reprises its snappy intro. The song ends with the lyrics "On Ruth, on Ruth, that's Ruth!", acknowledging Underwood for her leading on the marimba.

In an interview vocalist and keyboard player George Duke said that Zappa pushed for him to sing on "Inca Roads" and that beforehand Duke had no intentions of singing professionally and was only there to play keyboards. He went on to explain how Zappa had bought him a synthesizer (an instrument which Duke had disliked) and told him he could play around with it if he wanted. This led to Duke playing the synth part on "Inca Roads" as well.

The skip
Many early US vinyl LP copies of One Size Fits All contain a skip at 4:40 into Inca Roads just after the end of the guitar solo from Helsinki. 
These are marked "KENDUN A" in the runout grooves. The defect should have been caught during the test pressing stage. Defective copies were later recalled. The complex nature of the music makes it difficult to recognize the error without comparing to the correct version.

Legacy
In 2018, Prog magazine named "Inca Roads" at hundredth position in their list "The 100 Greatest Prog Songs Of All Time."

Personnel
Frank Zappa – guitar, backing vocals
George Duke – lead vocals, keyboards, synthesizer
Napoleon Murphy Brock – flute, tenor saxophone, backing vocals
Tom Fowler – bass
Chester Thompson – drums
Ruth Underwood – vibes, marimba, percussion

References

Frank Zappa songs
Songs about roads
Songs about indigenous peoples
Songs about extraterrestrial life
Songs about South America
Songs written by Frank Zappa
1975 songs
Song recordings produced by Frank Zappa